Francop is a quarter in the Harburg borough of the Free and Hanseatic city of Hamburg in northern Germany. In 2020 the population was 711.

History
Francop, probably founded in the mid-12th century, belonged - as to its government - to the Prince-Archbishopric of Bremen, established in 1180. In religious respect, however, Francop formed part of the Roman Catholic Diocese of Verden until after 1566 its incumbent bishops lost papal recognition, except of a last Catholic bishop from 1630 to 1631, respectively. In 1648 the Prince-Archbishopric was transformed into the Duchy of Bremen, which was first ruled in personal union by the Swedish and from 1715 on by the Hanoverian Crown. In 1823 the Duchy was abolished and its territory became part of the Stade Region. In 1932 Francop and other villages East of the Este were annexed to the County of Harburg in the then Lunenburg Region. By the Greater Hamburg Act of 1937 Francop was annexed to Hamburg state, and municipally integrated into the unity municipality of Hamburg (Einheitsgemeinde Hamburg) on 1 April 1938.

Geography

In 2008 according to the statistical office of Hamburg and Schleswig-Holstein, the quarter has a total area of 9.1 km2. Francop is part of the Altes Land region (old country or old land). In the north is the quarter Finkenwerder of the borough Hamburg-Mitte, in the east is the quarter Altenwerder, Moorburg, and Hausbruch. Francop borders in the south to Neugraben-Fischbek and in the west to Neuenfelde.

Demographics
In 2008 634 people were living in the Francop quarter.

In 1999, there were 322 households, out of which 24.8% had children under the age of 18 living with them, and 34.8% of all households were made up of individuals. The average household size was 2.3.

Population by year

Politics
These are the results of Francop in the Hamburg state election:

Notes

References

 Statistical office Hamburg and Schleswig-Holstein Statistisches Amt für Hamburg und Schleswig-Holstein, official website

External links

Quarters of Hamburg
Harburg, Hamburg